Masato Fujiwara (born January 23, 1976) is a Japanese mixed martial artist.

Mixed martial arts record

|-
| Loss
| align=center| 5-12-6
| Koji Nishioka
| Decision (majority)
| Shooto: Kitazawa Shooto Vol. 4
| 
| align=center| 2
| align=center| 5:00
| Tokyo, Japan
| 
|-
| Draw
| align=center| 5-11-6
| Hidekazu Asakura
| Draw
| Shooto: Gig North 5
| 
| align=center| 2
| align=center| 5:00
| Sapporo, Hokkaido, Japan
| 
|-
| Loss
| align=center| 5-11-5
| Kenichi Hattori
| Decision (majority)
| Shooto: Gig Central 16
| 
| align=center| 2
| align=center| 5:00
| Nagoya, Aichi, Japan
| 
|-
| Loss
| align=center| 5-10-5
| Shinji Sasaki
| Submission (triangle choke)
| Shooto: Grapplingman 6
| 
| align=center| 1
| align=center| 3:04
| Hiroshima, Japan
| 
|-
| Win
| align=center| 5-9-5
| Shinobu Miura
| Decision (split)
| Shooto: 11/30 in Kitazawa Town Hall
| 
| align=center| 2
| align=center| 5:00
| Setagaya, Tokyo, Japan
| 
|-
| Loss
| align=center| 4-9-5
| Masaya Takita
| Decision (unanimous)
| Shooto: Shooto Junkie Is Back!
| 
| align=center| 2
| align=center| 5:00
| Chiba, Japan
| 
|-
| Loss
| align=center| 4-8-5
| Takashi Nakakura
| Submission (triangle choke)
| Shooto 2003: 6/27 in Hiroshima Sun Plaza
| 
| align=center| 1
| align=center| 3:48
| Hiroshima, Japan
| 
|-
| Loss
| align=center| 4-7-5
| Naoki Matsushita
| Decision (unanimous)
| Shooto: Gig Central 3
| 
| align=center| 2
| align=center| 5:00
| Nagoya, Aichi, Japan
| 
|-
| Loss
| align=center| 4-6-5
| Takayuki Okochi
| TKO (punches)
| Shooto: Gig East 11
| 
| align=center| 2
| align=center| 4:24
| Tokyo, Japan
| 
|-
| Draw
| align=center| 4-5-5
| Naoki Matsushita
| Draw
| Shooto: Gig East 10
| 
| align=center| 2
| align=center| 5:00
| Tokyo, Japan
| 
|-
| Win
| align=center| 4-5-4
| Vincent Latoel
| Submission (triangle/armbar)
| Shooto: Wanna Shooto 2002
| 
| align=center| 1
| align=center| 3:53
| Setagaya, Tokyo, Japan
| 
|-
| Win
| align=center| 3-5-4
| Koji Takeuchi
| Decision (unanimous)
| Shooto: To The Top 10
| 
| align=center| 2
| align=center| 5:00
| Tokyo, Japan
| 
|-
| Loss
| align=center| 2-5-4
| Takeshi Yamazaki
| Decision (unanimous)
| Shooto: Gig East 4
| 
| align=center| 2
| align=center| 5:00
| Tokyo, Japan
| 
|-
| Draw
| align=center| 2-4-4
| Daisuke Sugie
| Draw
| Shooto: Gig East 2
| 
| align=center| 2
| align=center| 5:00
| Tokyo, Japan
| 
|-
| Win
| align=center| 2-4-3
| Masakazu Kuramochi
| TKO (cut)
| Shooto: Gig East 1
| 
| align=center| 1
| align=center| 1:01
| Tokyo, Japan
| 
|-
| Loss
| align=center| 1-4-3
| Ryan Bow
| KO (knees)
| Shooto: R.E.A.D. 4
| 
| align=center| 1
| align=center| 2:19
| Setagaya, Tokyo, Japan
| 
|-
| Draw
| align=center| 1-3-3
| Takenori Ito
| Draw
| Shooto: Las Grandes Viajes 6
| 
| align=center| 3
| align=center| 5:00
| Tokyo, Japan
|Return to Lightweight.
|-
| Draw
| align=center| 1-3-2
| Koichi Tanaka
| Draw
| Shooto: Las Grandes Viajes 3
| 
| align=center| 2
| align=center| 5:00
| Tokyo, Japan
|Featherweight debut.
|-
| Loss
| align=center| 1-3-1
| Ricardo Botelho
| Decision (unanimous)
| Shooto: Las Grandes Viajes 1
| 
| align=center| 3
| align=center| 5:00
| Tokyo, Japan
| 
|-
| Loss
| align=center| 1-2-1
| Tetsuji Kato
| Decision (unanimous)
| Shooto: Gig
| 
| align=center| 2
| align=center| 5:00
| Tokyo, Japan
| 
|-
| Draw
| align=center| 1-1-1
| Kazuhiro Kusayanagi
| Draw
| Shooto: Reconquista 2
| 
| align=center| 3
| align=center| 5:00
| Tokyo, Japan
|Return to Lightweight.
|-
| Loss
| align=center| 1-1
| Akihiro Gono
| Decision (unanimous)
| Shooto: Reconquista 1
| 
| align=center| 4
| align=center| 3:00
| Tokyo, Japan
|Middleweight debut.
|-
| Win
| align=center| 1-0
| Masanori Suda
| Submission (triangle armbar)
| Shooto: Let's Get Lost
| 
| align=center| 1
| align=center| 2:15
| Tokyo, Japan
|

See also
List of male mixed martial artists

References

External links
 
 Masato Fujiwara at mixedmartialarts.com
 Masato Fujiwara at fightmatrix.com

1976 births
Japanese male mixed martial artists
Lightweight mixed martial artists
Middleweight mixed martial artists
Living people